Gongora aceras is a species of orchid found in Colombia and western Ecuador.

References

aceras
Orchids of Colombia
Orchids of Ecuador